Francis Joseph McCourt (9 December 1925 – 1 June 2006) was a Northern Irish footballer who played as a wing half for Dundalk, Shamrock Rovers, Bristol Rovers, Manchester City, Colchester United and  Poole Town. He was born in Portadown.

McCourt was capped six times by Northern Ireland. He later moved to Washington, U.S.A. and died there in June 2006 at the age of 80.

References

1925 births
2006 deaths
Association football wing halves
Association footballers from Northern Ireland
Bristol Rovers F.C. players
Colchester United F.C. players
Dundalk F.C. players
English Football League players
League of Ireland players
Manchester City F.C. players
Northern Ireland international footballers
People from Portadown
Poole Town F.C. players
Shamrock Rovers F.C. players